Marquis de Vallado is a Spanish title bestowed upon Humphrey Walrond on 5 August 1653, by King Philip IV of Spain.

Walrond, from Sea, Somerset, was a distinguished Royalist commander, and subsequent Deputy Governor of Barbados. He defeated the Roundheads in the island in 1650, maintained a Royalist regime there throughout the Commonwealth and Protectorate, was appointed Deputy Governor in 1660, but continued to act as Governor until 1662.

Along with the Marquisate he was also created the Conde de Parama y Valderonda ("Count of Parama and Valderonda") and a Grandee of the 1st Class. It was general practice for the eldest son of the incumbent of the title to bear the lesser and courtesy title of Conde de Parama.

The Walrond family was closely associated with the Lyons family, who monopolised the Government of Antigua during the 18th century. The 5th Marquis de Vallado married Sarah Lyons (1731-1764), and the daughter of the 5th Marquis and Sarah Lyons, Catherine Walrond, married Captain John Lyons, by whom she had had 15 children, including Edmund Lyons, 1st Baron Lyons. Therefore, Richard Lyons, 1st Viscount Lyons, the diplomat who solved the Trent Affair; Sir Algernon McLennan Lyons, Admiral of the Fleet; and Richard Lyons Pearson, Assistant Commissioner of the Metropolitan Police, were all descendants of the 5th Marquis de Vallado, by Catherine Walrond, who was herself the daughter of Sarah Lyons (1731-1764).

The following is a list of those members of the Walrond family who inherited these Spanish honours:

Holders of the title

See also
Lyons family

References
Notes

Bibliography
 

 
Vallado
Noble titles created in 1653